Dario Passoni (born 9 February 1974) is an Italian former football midfielder.

Passoni was sold to Mantova for €800,000 in 2007.

On 31 August 2009, he was signed by Serie B outfit AlbinoLeffe for €250,000. At the same time Carlo Gervasoni moved to Mantova also for €250,000.

Passoni was involved in the 2011–12 Italian football match-fixing scandal and was banned from any soccer-related activities for fourteen months.

In July 2012, several players, including Passoni, were charged with sports fraud.

References

1974 births
Living people
People from Cassano d'Adda
Italian footballers
Italian expatriate footballers
Expatriate footballers in Russia
Russian Premier League players
Venezia F.C. players
S.S. Fidelis Andria 1928 players
S.S.C. Napoli players
A.C. ChievoVerona players
A.C.N. Siena 1904 players
Mantova 1911 players
U.S. Livorno 1915 players
U.C. AlbinoLeffe players
Association football midfielders
Serie A players
Serie B players
FC Elista players
Footballers from Lombardy
Sportspeople from the Metropolitan City of Milan